The 1939 Estonian Cup was the second season of the Estonian football knockout tournament. 11 teams took part of the competition. In the final, played on November 6 in Kadriorg Stadium in Tallinn, Tallinna Jalgpalliklubi won 4–1 over ESS Kalev Tallinn.

Preliminary round

Quarter-finals

Semi-finals

Final

References
Estonia Cup Finals, RSSSF

Cup
Estonian Cup seasons